Adelophryne is a genus of frogs in the family Eleutherodactylidae. They are native to northern South America east of the Andes, known roughly from the area corresponding to the Guiana Shield, as well as to the coastal area of Bahia, Brazil. Whether the genus is truly distinct from Phyzelaphryne remains uncertain. Common name shield frogs has been proposed for this genus, although the stem flea frog is used for some species.

Etymology
The generic name is derived from the Greek words adelos, meaning "unseen, unknown, obscure", and phryne for "toad". It refers to the fact that these small frogs were seldom collected until relatively lately.

Description
Adelophryne are small leaf-litter frogs.

The pupil of Adelophryne is oval and horizontally oriented. The tympanum is distinct. The digits are flattened and have asymmetrically pointed, laterally grooved, elongate discs. No webbing is present. The fourth finger is reduced in size. Males have a large, external subgular vocal sac.

Reproduction is through direct development, that is, eggs hatch directly into froglets, without free-living larval (tadpole) stage. Before this was confirmed for Adelophryne maranguapensis, the relatively large size of the eggs in this genus led many researcher to conclude that direct development was likely to be present.

Species
As of July 2021, there are twelve species:

 Adelophryne adiastola Hoogmoed and Lescure, 1984
Adelophryne amapaensis 
 Adelophryne baturitensis Hoogmoed, Borges, and Cascon, 1994
 Adelophryne glandulata Lourenço de Moraes, Ferreira, Fouquet, and Bastos, 2014
 Adelophryne gutturosa Hoogmoed and Lescure, 1984
 Adelophryne maranguapensis Hoogmoed, Borges, and Cascon, 1994
 Adelophryne meridionalis Santana, Fonseca, Neves, and Carvalho, 2012
 Adelophryne michelin Lourenço-de-Moraes, Dias, Mira-Mendes, de Oliveira, Barth, Ruas, Vences, Solé, and Bastos, 2018
 Adelophryne mucronatus Lourenço-de-Moraes, Solé, and Toledo, 2012
Adelophryne nordestina Lourenço-de-Moraes, Lisboa, Drummond, Moura, Moura, Lyra, Guarnieri, Mott, Hoogmoed, and Santana, 2021
 Adelophryne pachydactyla Hoogmoed, Borges, and Cascon, 1994
 Adelophryne patamona MacCulloch, Lathrop, Kok, Minter, Khan, and Barrio-Amoros, 2008

The genus is likely to contain several undescribed species.

References

 
Eleutherodactylidae
Amphibian genera
Amphibians of South America
Taxa named by Marinus Steven Hoogmoed